Denis Ezhov or Denis Yezhov (born February 28, 1985) is a Russian professional ice hockey player who currently plays for Gyergyói HK of the Erste Liga. Ezhov was selected by the Buffalo Sabres in the 4th round (114th overall) of the 2003 NHL Entry Draft.

Yezhov competed in the 2003 World Junior Ice Hockey Championships where he won a gold medal as a member of Team Russia.

Career statistics

Regular season and playoffs

International

References

External links 

1985 births
Buffalo Sabres draft picks
Living people
Russian ice hockey defencemen
Avangard Omsk players
Traktor Chelyabinsk players
HC Lada Togliatti players
HC CSK VVS Samara players
Metallurg Novokuznetsk players
Atlant Moscow Oblast players
Amur Khabarovsk players
Sportspeople from Tolyatti
Severstal Cherepovets players